The 1999 Nigerian Senate election in Benue State was held on February 20, 1999, to elect members of the Nigerian Senate to represent Benue State. David Mark representing Benue South, Joseph Waku representing Benue North-West, and Daniel Saror representing Benue North-East all won on the platform of the Peoples Democratic Party.

Overview

Summary

Results

Benue South 
The election was won by David Mark of the Peoples Democratic Party.

Benue North-West 
The election was won by Joseph Waku of the Peoples Democratic Party.

Benue North-East 
The election was won by Daniel Saror of the People's Democratic Party.

References 

Ben
Ben
Benue State Senate elections